Diego Rosales (born November 1, 2005) is an American soccer player who plays as a defender for USL Championship club Las Vegas Lights.

Club career
Born in South Gate, California, Rosales joined the youth academy at Los Angeles FC in 2016, being part of the club's inaugural under-12 side. In January 2020, at just age 14, Rosales was called into the Los Angeles FC first-team for their pre-season camp. He made his unofficial debut for the senior side on January 25, 2020 in a friendly against Peñarol, appearing in the second half.

Las Vegas Lights
On May 5, 2021, Rosales joined Las Vegas Lights, an affiliate club of Los Angeles FC, on a USL academy contract. He made his professional debut that night in the USL Championship against LA Galaxy II. Rosales came on as a 66th minute substitute for Raheem Edwards as Las Vegas Lights were defeated 0–5.

Career statistics

Club

References

2005 births
Living people
Sportspeople from California
American soccer players
Association football defenders
Las Vegas Lights FC players
USL Championship players
Soccer players from California